The 2nd Tank Battalion (2nd Tanks) was an armored battalion of the United States Marine Corps which was based out of the Marine Corps Base Camp Lejeune, North Carolina.  It fell under the command of the 2nd Marine Division and the II Marine Expeditionary Force. The United States Marine Corps plans to deactivate its tank battalions in order to conform to its 2030 modernization plan. After 79 years of service the 2nd Tank Battalion was decommissioned on May 5, 2021.

History

World War II
The battalion formed on December 20, 1941, at Camp Elliott, San Diego,  California, growing to the standard organization with a headquarters, service and four letter companies (Able, Baker, Charlie, Dog). Baker Company deployed to Samoa in January and Charlie Company sailed with the 2nd Marine Regiment to the Solomon Islands.  On August 8, 1942, two M3 tanks participated in seizing Tanambogo Island against heavy resistance.  2nd Tanks  participated in every action of the 2nd Marine Division to include the Battle of Tarawa, Battle of Saipan and Battle of Okinawa.  After a brief tour with the Japan occupation force, the battalion returned to its permanent garrison at MCB Camp Lejeune.

Korean War
With the coming of the Korean War, most of the battalion's personnel immediately augmented the 1st Tank Battalion. It also provided the cadre for the 8th Tank Battalion, a wartime expansion force battalion. Garrison duty on the East Coast of the US involved support to routine deployments in the Mediterranean and Caribbean. 2nd Tank Battalion units became involved in two interventions in Lebanon, the Cuban Missile Crisis deployment, the Dominican Republic and the Guantanamo Base defense effort.

Vietnam & Post-war years
The Vietnam War again caused the battalion to provide replacements for the tank battalions deployed there.  After the Vietnam War, peacetime deployments swelled with participation in NATO exercises. Units of the battalion also saw brief combat in the invasion of Grenada.

Gulf War

The battalion as a whole saw its first combat since the Second World War in 1991, as it moved with the 2nd Marine Division to Saudi Arabia for the liberation of Kuwait. Augmented by companies of the 4th Tank Battalion, 2nd Tanks served as the division reserve for the four-day war in Kuwait.

Iraq War

The opening of 2003 found 2nd Tank Battalion preparing for deployment to Kuwait in support of Operation Iraqi Freedom.  Led by Lt Col Michael J. Oehl they deployed under the operational control of the 1st Marine Division and were attached to Regimental Combat Team 5 (RCT-5) upon arrival in theater.  On March 20, 2nd Tank Battalion led RCT-5 and 1st Marine Division across the southern Iraqi border, initiating an attack that would ultimately result in the seizure of the Iraqi capital of Baghdad and the destruction of the Saddam Hussein regime.  2nd Tank Battalion fought numerous engagements in support of Operation Iraqi Freedom, to include battles in An Numaniyah, Al Aziziyah, and eastern Baghdad.  Following the seizure of Baghdad, Company D and the AT-TOW Platoon supported Task Force Tripoli and their movement into Tikrit.  Upon the cessation of combat operations, 2nd Tank Battalion participated in humanitarian operations in Baghdad.  The battalion  redeployed to MCB Camp Lejeune on May 29, 2003.

In November 2004 while deployed for Operation Iraqi Freedom 2-2, Company C attached to Regimental Combat Team 1 (RCT-1), 1st Marine Division and Company A attached to Regimental Combat Team 7 (RCT-7), 1st Marine Division participated by assisting in portions of Operation Phantom Fury, the recapture of Fallujah.

Afghanistan War

In December 2009, 2nd Tank Battalion deployed to Helmand Province for their inaugural deployment to Afghanistan as part of the surge. They remained in Afghanistan until 2013 as a result of the U.S. forces drawdown.

Unit awards
A unit citation or commendation is an award bestowed upon an organization for the action cited. Members of the unit who participated in said actions are allowed to wear on their uniforms the awarded unit citation. 2nd Tanks has been presented with the following awards:

See also

List of United States Marine Corps battalions
Organization of the United States Marine Corps

Notes

References

Bibliography

Web

 2nd Tank Battalion official website

Tank 2